is a district located in Shiribeshi Subprefecture, Hokkaido, Japan.

As of 2004, the district has an estimated population of 3,278 and a density of 14.25 persons per km2. The total area is 230.06 km2.

Towns and villages
Kamoenai
Tomari

Districts in Hokkaido